Ihnatenko or Ignatenko is a gender-neutral Ukrainian surname. It may refer to:
Aleksandr Ignatenko (born 1951), Russian footballer and coach
Artyom Ignatenko (born 1990), Kazakhstani ice hockey player
Danylo Ihnatenko (born 1997), Ukrainian footballer
Dmitry Ignatenko (disambiguation), multiple individuals
Oleksandr Ihnatenko (born 1993), Ukrainian footballer
Petr Ignatenko (born 1987), Russian road racing cyclist
Pavel Ignatenko (born 1995), Belarusian figure skater
Vasily Ignatenko (1961–1986), Soviet firefighter
Vladislav Ignatenko (born 1998), Ukrainian-born Russian footballer

See also
 
 
8787 Ignatenko, a minor planet

Ukrainian-language surnames